Estadio Manuel Gómez Arellano was a multi-use stadium in Chimbote (Ancash, Peru).  It is no longer used by football team José Gálvez FBC.  The stadium held 15,000 people.  It was replaced by Estadio Olímpico Municipal in 2007.

Football venues in Peru
Buildings and structures in Ancash Region